That's Me - The Greatest Hits is a 1998 greatest hits compilation album featuring the best of the English-language solo work of Agnetha Fältskog from ABBA. It is named after the ABBA song "That's Me".

In addition to solo hits by Fältskog, the album includes three ABBA songs with lead vocals by Agnetha and the recently discovered 1981 demo of "The Queen of Hearts".

Complementing this album is the 1996 compilation My Love, My Life, which concentrates on her Swedish-language hits.

The version of "It's So Nice to Be Rich" included on this album is actually a previously unreleased edit in mono sourced from the film P&B, as the stereo master tape seems to have been lost.

The album was elected by Fred Bronson from Billboard as the #8 best 1998's album, and William Ruhlmann from AllMusic give the album four of five stars in his review.

Track listing 

 "The Heat Is On"
 "The Last Time"
 "Let It Shine"
 "The Winner Takes It All" - ABBA
 "I Wasn't the One (Who Said Goodbye)" (Duet with Peter Cetera)
 "The Way You Are" (Duet with Ola Håkansson)
 "It's So Nice To Be Rich"
 "I Won't Let You Go"
 "Never Again" (Duet with Tomas Ledin)
 "Eyes Of A Woman"
 "Slipping Through My Fingers" - ABBA
 "One Way Love"
 "Can't Shake Loose"
 "Wrap Your Arms Around Me"
 "The Queen Of Hearts"
 "That's Me" - ABBA
 "Turn The World Around"
 "You're There"
 "Fly Like The Eagle" (Duet with Ola Håkansson)

References

Agnetha Fältskog compilation albums
1998 compilation albums